Jasper is a town in and the county seat of Marion County, Tennessee, United States. The population was 3,612 at the 2020 census. The town was formed in 1820 from lands acquired from Betsy Pack (1770–1851), daughter of Cherokee Chief John Lowery. Jasper is part of the Chattanooga, TN–GA Metropolitan Statistical Area.

History
Jasper is named for William Jasper, a Revolutionary War hero from South Carolina.

Jasper was formed from land leased for $1 from Elizabeth aka "Betsy" Pack, daughter of Chief John Lowery and beloved Cherokee Woman Nannie Watts.  Her descendants and friends of the family gather on a semi-annual basis to place flowers at the courthouse marker. The town's primary north-south street, which follows a section of Tennessee State Route 150, has been named in honor of Pack.

Geography

The town lies in the southwestern Sequatchie Valley in a relatively flat area surrounded by steep escarpments of the Cumberland Plateau on the north and west, low hills on the east, and Guntersville Lake (part of the Tennessee River) on the south. The Sequatchie River flows just east of the town, and empties into the Tennessee River at the town's southeastern boundary. Kimball borders Jasper to the southwest.

Jasper's courthouse square lies at the intersection of U.S. Route 72 (Main Street) and Tennessee State Route 150 (Betsy Pack Drive). US-72 (which runs concurrently with U.S. Route 64 and U.S. Route 41 in Jasper) connects the town with Chattanooga to the southeast and Kimball, South Pittsburg, and Alabama to the southwest. State Route 150 connects Jasper with the Grundy County area atop the Plateau to the northwest.   Tennessee State Route 28, part of the primary north-south corridor in the Sequatchie Valley, intersects US-72 in southeastern Jasper.  Interstate 24 passes through Jasper's southern outskirts.

Demographics

2020 census

As of the 2020 United States census, there were 3,612 people, 1,376 households, and 906 families residing in the town.

2000 census
As of the census of 2000, there were 3,214 people, 1,299 households, and 928 families residing in the town. The racial makeup of the town was 90.39% White, 7.34% African American, 0.31% Native American, 0.65% Asian, 0.03% Pacific Islander, 0.19% from other races, and 1.09% from two or more races. Hispanic or Latino of any race were 1.21% of the population.

There were 1,299 households, out of which 28.9% had children under the age of 18 living with them, 55.9% were married couples living together, 12.4% had a female householder with no husband present, and 28.5% were non-families. 25.9% of all households were made up of individuals, and 11.6% had someone living alone who was 65 years of age or older. The average household size was 2.40 and the average family size was 2.87.

In the town, the population was spread out, with 22.5% under the age of 18, 8.3% from 18 to 24, 28.1% from 25 to 44, 25.9% from 45 to 64, and 15.3% who were 65 years of age or older. The median age was 39 years. For every 100 females, there were 92.9 males. For every 100 females age 18 and over, there were 89.3 males.

The median income for a household in the town was $35,926, and the median income for a family was $42,467. Males had a median income of $32,500 versus $26,250 for females. The per capita income for the town was $18,311. About 11.4% of families and 15.3% of the population were below the poverty line, including 24.8% of those under age 18 and 4.0% of those age 65 or over.

Transportation 

Notable people
Bob Long, professional baseball player
Eric Westmoreland, former member of the University of Tennessee Volunteers football team; former National Football League (NFL) linebacker for the Jacksonville Jaguars and Cleveland Browns

References

External links

Official site
Municipal Technical Advisory Service entry for Jasper – information on local government, elections, and link to charter

Towns in Marion County, Tennessee
Towns in Tennessee
County seats in Tennessee
Chattanooga metropolitan area
Tennessee populated places on the Tennessee River
Chattanooga metropolitan area county seats